Deep Run is a tributary of the Tohickon Creek in Bedminster Township, Bucks County, Pennsylvania in the United States.

Statistics
Wolf Run lies entirely within Bedminster Township. Its GNIS identification number is 1191669, its Pennsylvania Department of Environmental Resources identification number is 03141. The average slope is

Course
Wolf Run rises in Bedminster Township north of Pennsylvania Route 113 (Bedminster Road) near the village of Bedminster and is northeast oriented in a relatively straight course to the Tohickon Creek.

Geology
Appalachian Highlands Division
Piedmont Province
Gettysburg-Newark Lowland Section
Brunswick Formation
Wolf Run lies within the Brunswick Formation in the Newark Basin laid down during the Jurassic and the Triassic. Rocks includes mudstone, siltstone, and reddish-brown, green, and brown shale. Mineralogy includes red and dark-gray argillite and hornfels.

Crossings and Bridges
Rolling Hills Road
Haas Court
Creamery Road

See also
List of rivers of the United States
List of rivers of Pennsylvania
List of Delaware River tributaries

References

Rivers of Pennsylvania
Rivers of Bucks County, Pennsylvania
Tributaries of Tohickon Creek